Zoltán Szabó (born 23 December 1980 in Budapest) is a Hungarian football player who currently plays for Lombard Pápa TFC.

References 
HLSZ

1980 births
Living people
Footballers from Budapest
Hungarian footballers
Association football midfielders
Újpest FC players
Monori SE players
Vác FC players
Budafoki LC footballers
FC Dabas footballers
Lombard-Pápa TFC footballers
Ceglédi VSE footballers
Hungarian expatriate footballers
Expatriate footballers in Austria
Hungarian expatriate sportspeople in Austria